Phillips Academy (also known as PA, Phillips Academy Andover, or simply Andover) is a co-educational university-preparatory school for boarding and day students in grades 9–12, along with a post-graduate year. The school is in Andover, Massachusetts, United States, 25 miles north of Boston. Phillips Academy has 1,131 students, and is highly selective, accepting just 9% for the 2022–2023 school year. It is part of the Eight Schools Association and the Ten Schools Admissions Organization, as well as the G30 Schools Group.

Founded in 1778, Andover is one of the oldest incorporated secondary schools in the United States. It has educated a long list of notable alumni through its history, including American presidents George H. W. Bush and George W. Bush, foreign heads of state, numerous members of Congress, five Nobel laureates and six Medal of Honor recipients. It has been referred to by many contemporary sources as the most elite boarding school in America.

It became coeducational in 1973, the year in which it merged with its neighbor girls' school Abbot Academy.

Overview

Phillips Academy is the oldest incorporated academy in the United States, established in 1778 by Samuel Phillips Jr. His uncle, Dr. John Phillips, later founded Phillips Exeter Academy in 1781. Phillips Academy's endowment stood at just over one billion dollars as of February 2016. Andover is subject to the control of a board of trustees, headed by Amy Falls, who succeeded Peter Currie, business executive and former Netscape Chief Financial Officer, who himself had taken over as president of the Phillips Academy Board of Trustees on July 1, 2012. On December 5, 2019, Dr. Raynard S. Kington, 13th President of Grinnell College, was named the 16th Head of School.

Phillips Academy admitted only boys until the school became coeducational in 1973, the year of Phillips Academy's merger with Abbot Academy, a boarding school for girls also in Andover. Abbot Academy, founded in 1828, was one of the first incorporated schools for girls in New England. Then-headmaster Theodore Sizer of Phillips and Donald Gordon of Abbot oversaw the merger.

Andover traditionally educated its students for Yale, just as Phillips Exeter Academy educated its students for Harvard, and Lawrenceville prepped students for Princeton.

The school's student-run newspaper, The Phillipian, is the oldest secondary school newspaper in the United States, the next oldest secondary school newspaper being The Exonian, Phillips Exeter Academy's weekly. The Phillipian was first published on July 28, 1857, and has been published regularly since 1878. It retains financial and editorial independence from Phillips Academy, having completed a $500,000 endowment drive in 2014. Students comprise the editorial board and make all decisions for the paper, consulting with two faculty advisors at their own discretion. The Philomathean Society is one of the oldest high school debate societies in the nation, second to the Daniel Webster Debate Society at Phillips Exeter Academy.

Phillips Academy also runs a five-week summer session for approximately 600 students entering grades 8 through 12.

History

Phillips Academy was founded during the American Revolution as an all-boys school in 1778 by Samuel Phillips Jr.

Phillips Academy's traditional rival is Phillips Exeter Academy, which was established three years later in Exeter, New Hampshire, by Samuel Phillips' uncle, Dr. John Phillips, who was also a major contributor to Andover's founding. The two schools still maintain a rivalry. The football teams have met nearly every year since 1878, making it the oldest prep school rivalry in the country. In 1882, the first high school lacrosse teams were formed at Phillips Academy, Phillips Exeter Academy and the Lawrenceville School.

Several figures from the revolutionary period are associated with the school. George Washington visited the school during his presidency in 1789, and Washington's nephews later attended the school. John Hancock signed the school's articles of incorporation and the great seal of the school was designed by Paul Revere.

For a hundred years of its history, Phillips Academy shared its campus with the Andover Theological Seminary, which was founded on Phillips Hill in 1807 by orthodox Calvinists who had fled Harvard College after it appointed a liberal Unitarian theologian to a professorship of divinity. The Andover Theological Seminary was independent of Phillips Academy but shared the same board of directors. In 1908, the seminary departed Phillips Academy, leaving behind its key buildings: academic building Pearson Hall (formerly a chapel), and dormitories Foxcroft Hall and Bartlet Hall.  These buildings later became part of the Andover campus, which was expanded in the 1920s and 1930s around this historic core with new buildings of similar Georgian style: Samuel Phillips Hall, George Washington Hall, Samuel Morse Hall, Paul Revere Hall, Oliver Wendell Holmes Library, Commons, the Addison Gallery of American Art and Cochran Chapel. Small portions of Andover's campus were laid out by Frederick Law Olmsted, designer of Central Park and himself a graduate of the school.

Revere's design of the school's seal incorporated bees, a beehive, and the sun. The school's primary motto, Non Sibi, located in the sun, means "not for oneself". The school's second motto, Finis Origine Pendet, meaning "the end depends upon the beginning", is scrolled across the bottom of the seal.

Phillips was one of the schools where students on the Chinese Educational Mission were sent to study by the Qing dynasty government from 1878 to 1881. One of the students, Liang Cheng, later became the Chinese ambassador to the United States.

During the 1930s the school was involved in the International Schoolboy Fellowship, a cultural exchange program between US academies, British public schools and Nazi boarding schools.

Phillips Academy curriculum and extracurricular activities include music ensembles, 30 competitive sports, a campus newspaper, a radio station, and a debate club. In 1973 Phillips Academy merged with neighboring Abbot Academy, which was founded in 1829 as one of the first schools for girls in New England and named for Sarah Abbot. After existing at Phillips Academy almost since its inception, secret societies were officially disbanded in 1949. Despite this, at least one secret society continues to exist.

Phillips Academy is one of only a few private high schools (others include Roxbury Latin and St. Andrew's School) in the United States that attained need-blind admissions in 2007 and 2008, and it has continued this policy through the present. In 2013 it received 3,029 applications and accepted 13%, a record low acceptance rate for the school. Of those accepted, 79% went on to matriculate at the academy.

Academics
Phillips Academy follows a trimester program, where a school year is divided into three terms, with each term lasting approximately 10 weeks. Classes are held from Monday to Friday, with the first period of the day beginning at 8:30 am and the last period ending at 2:50 pm. On Wednesdays, classes end early at 1:00 pm in order to provide more time for athletics, clubs, and community service.

Many courses are year-long, while others last only one to two terms. Most students take five courses each trimester. Four-year students at Phillips Academy are required to take courses in English, foreign language, mathematics (through precalculus), history and social science, laboratory science, art, music, philosophy and religious studies, and physical education. Students may also choose to pursue an independent research program in a topic of choice under the guidance of faculty members if there are no more courses suitable for them in one or more disciplines.

Andover does not rank students, and rather than a four-point GPA scale, Phillips Academy calculates GPA using a six-point system. The Office of the Dean of Studies claims that there is no formal equivalent between the zero-to-six system and a conventional letter-grade system. However, a six is considered outstanding and is (theoretically) rarely awarded, a five is the lowest honors grade, and a two is the lowest passing grade. Grades earned in classes are sometimes weighted at the discretion of the instructor, and the school provides no uniform scale for converting percent scores into grades on the six-point scale.

For the 239 members of the class of 2018, average SAT scores were 720 on the English section and 740 on the Math section.

Facilities

Academic facilities

 Bulfinch Hall was designed by Asher Benjamin, a student of architect Charles Bulfinch, and built in 1819. It now houses the English Department and received renovations during the summer and fall term of 2012.
 The Gelb Science Center, named after alumnus donor Richard L. Gelb, opened for classes in January 2004. It replaced the older Evans Hall which was built in 1963 and demolished following the completion of Gelb. Gelb has three floors, each devoted to a separate science. The first floor houses biology, the second floor physics, and the third floor chemistry. Gelb also has an observatory above the third floor. 
 Graham House was formerly used by both the school's psychology department and the school's psychological counselors. The psychology department has since moved to the Rebecca M. Sykes Wellness Center.

 Graves Hall is used by the music department. Built in 1882, it was named after Professor William Blair Graves and was originally a chemical laboratory. The building houses a rehearsal space (Pfatteicher Room), a concert hall (Timken Hall), an electronic music studio, and several classrooms and practice rooms.
 Morse Hall is used by the Math Department, CAMD (Community and Multicultural Development), the student-run radio station (WPAA), and some of the student-run publications. Morse Hall is named after Samuel Morse, who graduated from Phillips Academy in 1805 and later invented the telegraph and Morse code.

 Oliver Wendell Holmes Library (OWHL) was built in 1929 (renovated 1987 and 2018–2019) and is named after Oliver Wendell Holmes, Sr., an 1825 graduate of Phillips Academy. The library's construction was funded by Thomas Cochran and Louis Cochran Savage in the names of their brothers William, Class of 1895, and Montcreiff, Class of 1900, costing around $500,000. It is built in the Georgian Revival architectural style. The hip roof contains a skylight to bring natural light into the interior spaces.The library houses more than 120,000 works. Located in OWHL is the Garver Room, known to students as "Silent Study." The Garver Room containing the most comprehensive secondary-school reference collection in the country. In 2019, the OWHL received the Internet Archive's "Hero Award" for its work on digitizing its book collection and making it available via controlled digital lending (i.e. providing digital copies to one user at a time). The 2018-2019 renovations also saw the doubling in size of the school's makerspace (dubbed "The Nest"). The updated facility houses a data lab, two laser cutters, four Makerbot 3-D printers, two resin printers, and a room for robotics groups. Over 50 classes make use of The Nest as a teaching facility.
 Pearson Hall, one of the oldest structures on campus, is the classics building. Built in 1817, it once was the main building of the Andover Theological Seminary.  The only subjects with classes that meet in Pearson are Latin, Greek, Greek literature, mythology, and etymology. It was named after the school's first headmaster, Eliphalet Pearson.
 Samuel Phillips Hall was built in 1924 and named after the founder of the school. This building houses the languages, history, and social sciences departments, as well as the school's language lab.

Student facilities
 Cochran Chapel is a neo-Georgian church located on the north side of campus. It is also home to the philosophy, religious studies, and community service departments. A biweekly All School Meeting is held here on Fridays.
 Paresky Commons is the school's dining hall. The basement of Commons also houses "Susie's" (originally the Riley Room, and later "the den" until spring 2012), a grill-style student hangout/convenience store.
 George Washington Hall was built in 1926 and has since undergone many additions and renovations. The building serves numerous functions, including as an administration building (Head of School's office, dean of studies, dean of students, among others), a post-office (a mail-room), and the Day Student Lounge and locker area. The hall also houses the drama and arts departments.
 The Log Cabin is located in the  Cochran Wildlife Sanctuary on the northeastern edge of campus and serves as a place for student groups to hold meetings as well as sleep-overs.
 Rebecca M. Sykes Wellness Center houses both physical and mental health facilities for students.
 The Snyder Center is a 98,000 square-foot space, housing athletic facilities for students, including squash courts and an indoor track.
 The Pan Athletic Center is a 70,000 square-foot athletic facility for students, including a swimming and diving complex and dance studios.

The school also has dormitories to house the roughly 800 students that board. These buildings range in size from housing as few as four to as many as 40 students. The campus is organized into five "clusters," groups of dorms situated closely together. These five clusters are named Abbot, Flagstaff, Pine Knoll, West Quad North, and West Quad South. Each cluster contains around 220 students, 40 faculty families, and a cluster dean and are responsible for organizing social events, orientation, study breaks, and munches (cluster-wide snacking social events).

Two notable dorms are America House, where the song America was penned, and Stowe House, where American writer Harriet Beecher Stowe (author of Uncle Tom's Cabin) lived while her husband taught at the Andover Theological Seminary. None of the original buildings remain; the oldest dorm is Blanchard House, built in 1789. Several dorms are named after prominent alumni, such as Henry L. Stimson, Secretary of War during World War II, and men instrumental in the founding of the academy, such as Nathan Hale and Paul Revere. Also located on campus is The Andover Inn. Built in 1930, The Andover Inn is a New England country inn with 30 rooms and meeting space.

Museums

The Addison Gallery of American Art is an art museum given to the school by alumnus Thomas Cochran in memory of his friend Keturah Addison Cobb. Its permanent collection includes Winslow Homer's Eight Bells, along with work by John Singleton Copley, Benjamin West, Thomas Eakins, James McNeill Whistler, Frederic Remington, George Bellows, Edward Hopper, Georgia O'Keeffe, Jackson Pollock, Frank Stella, and Andrew Wyeth. The museum also features collections in American photography and decorative arts, with silver and furniture dating back to precolonial America, and a collection of colonial model ships. A rotating schedule of exhibitions is open to students and the public alike. In the spring of 2006, the Phillips Academy Board of Trustees approved a $30-million campaign to renovate and expand the Addison Gallery. Construction on the Addison began in the middle of 2008 and, as of September 7, 2010, is complete, and the museum is once again open to the Phillips Academy community and the broader community of the town of Andover.

The Robert S. Peabody Institute of Archaeology was founded in 1901 and is now "one of the nation's major repositories of Native American archaeological collections". The collection includes materials from the Northeast, Southeast, Midwest, Southwest, Mexico and the Arctic, and range from Paleo Indian (more than 10,000 years ago) to the present day. Since the early 1990s, the museum has been at the forefront of compliance with the Native American Graves Protection and Repatriation Act. It currently serves as an educational museum for the students of Phillips Academy, but is also accessible to researchers, public schools, and visitors by appointment.

Athletics

History

Athletic competition has long been a part of the Phillips Academy tradition. As early as 1805, football was being played on school grounds, according to a letter that Henry Pearson wrote his father, Eliphalet Pearson in 1805, saying, "I cannot write a long letter as I am very tired after having played at football all this afternoon." The first ever interscholastic football game between high schools was in 1875, when Phillips Academy played against Adams Academy.
One of the oldest schoolboy rivalries in American football is the Andover/Exeter competition, started in 1878. That year, the first Andover/Exeter baseball game took place, and The Phillipian returned from hiatus, named its first Board and began publishing regularly. Similar boarding school traditions include the Choate-Deerfield rivalry and Hotchkiss-Taft rivalry.

Today, Phillips Academy is an athletic powerhouse among New England private schools. Since the Constitution of the Phillips Academy Athletic Association was drawn up in 1903 with the objective of "Athletics for All," Andover has established 29 different interscholastic programs, and 44 intramural or instructional programs, including fencing, tai chi, figure skating, and yoga. Andover Athletes have been successful in winning over 110 New England Championships in these different sports over the last three decades alone, and have even had the chance to compete abroad, in such competitions as the Henley Royal Regatta in Henley, England, for crew.

The athletic directors of Andover and the other members of the Eight Schools Association (ESA) compose the Eight Schools Athletic Council, which organizes sports events and tournaments among ESA schools. Andover is also a member of the New England Preparatory School Athletic Council.

As a way to encourage all students to try new things and stay healthy, all students are required to have an athletic commitment each term. A range of instructional sports are available for those who wish to try new things, and for those already established in a sport, most teams have at least a varsity and junior varsity squad.

Sports
A variety of sports are offered:

Fall athletic offerings

 Crew (instructional)
 Cross country
 Dance (Ballet, Modern, Hip-Hop; Beg–Adv levels)
 Fencing (instructional)
 Field hockey
 Skating (instructional)
 FIT (Fundamentals In Training)
 Football
 Gunga FIT ("extreme" version of FIT)
 Outdoor Pursuits (S&R)
 Pilates
 SLAM (instructional [cheerleading])
 Soccer
 Soccer (intramural)
 Squash (instructional)
 Swimming (instructional)
 Tennis (instructional)
 Volleyball (girls')
 Volleyball (instructional)
 Water polo (boys')
 Yoga
 Zumba

Winter athletic offerings

 Basketball
 Basketball (intramural)
 Dance (Ballet, Modern, Hip-Hop; Beg–Adv levels)
 FIT (Fundamentals In Training)
 Gunga FIT ("extreme" version of FIT)
 Hockey
 Hockey (intramural)
 Indoor cycling (instructional/cycling pre-season)
 Indoor track
 Junior Basketball (intramural)
 Nordic skiing
 Outdoor Pursuits (S&R)
 Recreational cross-country skiing
 SLAM (Spirit Leaders [cheerleading])
 Squash
 Squash (intramural)
 Swimming and diving
 Wrestling
 Yoga
 Zumba

Spring athletic offerings

 Baseball
 Crew
 Cycling
 Dance (Ballet, Modern, Hip-Hop; Beg–Adv levels)
 Fencing (instructional)
 FIT (Fundamentals In Training)
 Golf
 Gunga FIT ("extreme" version of FIT)
 Lacrosse
 Outdoor Pursuits (S&R)
 Pilates
 Softball
 Squash (instructional)
 Swimming (instructional)
 Tennis
 Tennis (intramural)
 Track
 Ultimate Frisbee
 Ultimate Frisbee (intramural)
 Volleyball (boys')
 Water polo (girls')
 Yoga

Student body 
For the 2020–2021 school year, the Andover student body included students from 44 states/territories and 51 countries. Self reported students of color comprise 41.9% of the student body (Asian 40.1%, Black 10.4%, Hispanic/Latino 9.4%, Native Hawaiian or Pacific Islander 1.2%, Indigenous Peoples of the Americas 2.3%). Self reported legacy students (defined as students that "have at least one immediate family member who is currently attending or has previously attended Andover.") account for 33.2% of the students.

Andover has its own nomenclature for grade levels. Juniors are students in their first year, Lowers are in their second year, Uppers are in their third year, and Seniors are in their fourth year. Andover admits postgraduate students as well ("PGs").

73.7 percent of Andover students live on campus in dorms or houses while day students from the surrounding communities make up the remaining 26.3 percent of the student body.

The Phillipians boast a diverse political landscape, in the 2021 State of the Academy 36.1% identified as liberal, 13.2% as independent, 11.3% as conservative, 4.0% as communist, 3.2% as libertarian, 3.2% as socialist, 1.6% did not identify with the above, leaving 21.8% who were unsure as to their political affiliation.

The Phillips Academy Poll 

The Phillips Academy Poll (also known as Andover Poll) is a public opinion research institute based at Phillips Academy. The organization studies political sentiments by surveying registered voters by telephone. The poll’s findings have been covered by MSNBC, Fox News, BBC News, The New Yorker, Politico, The Guardian, Newsweek, NPR, and FiveThirtyEight. It is a student-led organization and the first public opinion poll to be conducted by an institution of secondary education.

Organization 
The Phillips Academy Poll is a student organization at Phillips Academy in Andover, Massachusetts, founded in 2021 by Alex Shieh and Patrick Chen. The organization's polling is funded by the Abbot Academy Fund, a grant-giving organization furthering the ideals of Abbot Academy, which merged with Phillips Academy in 1973.

Methodology 
The Phillips Academy Poll conducts surveys via telephone, using interactive voice response technology that allows respondents to indicate their responses via the keypad. Outgoing phone calls are initiated with an automated dialing system. The poll's sample is achieved through random digit dialing. Within the area codes assigned to the location being polled, phone numbers are dialed at random, and the response rate is approximately 2-3%. Polling results are interpreted by raking, also known as iterative proportional fitting. This procedure adjusts the weighting for each response so the sample more accurately reflects the demographics and partisan affiliations of the general electorate.

Student Civic Leader Summit 
On the weekend before Election Day, The Phillips Academy Poll hosts a conference for high school students, featuring prominent political figures as guests. The summits are held to encourage civic engagement among members of Generation Z, as well as to spread understanding of opinion polling. The 2022 summit featured speeches from Seth Moulton, Larry Sabato, Arnon Mishkin, Adam Frisch, and representatives from the Harvard Institute of Politics.

Criticism 
Andy Smith, the director of the University of New Hampshire Survey Center, has criticized The Phillips Academy Poll's use of interactive voice response to conduct polling, asking, "Why would you want to talk with a computer about your views on politics unless you really want to express your views on politics?"

Tuition and financial aid
For the 2021–2022 academic year, Phillips Academy charged boarding students $61,950 and day students $48,020. In the 2018–2019 academic year, Phillips Academy charged boarding students $55,800 and day students $43,300, making it more expensive than HMC schools and among the most expensive boarding schools in the world. Tuition to Phillips Academy has increased at rate of 4.27% a year since the 2002 academic year, or 3.76% per year over the last decade. There are mandatory fees for boarding students and optional fees on top of tuition. These were an estimated $2400/year plus travel to and from the academy in the 2017–2018 academic year.

Phillips Academy offers needs-blind financial aid. In the 2021–2022 academic year, 100% of demonstrated financial need was met with 47% of students receiving some form of financial aid and 15% of students receiving full scholarships. Returning students receive an average grant of $40,800.

Affiliations
Andover is a member of the Eight Schools Association, begun informally in 1973–74 and formalized in 2006. Andover was host to the annual meeting of ESA in April 2008. It is also a member of the Ten Schools Admissions Organization, founded in 1956. There is a seven-school overlap of membership between the two groups.  In addition, Andover is a member of the G20 Schools group, an international organization of independent secondary schools.

Controversies
In 2013, Phillips Academy drew national attention for apparent bias against girls and women, as highlighted by a low number of girls in student leadership.

Reports in 2016 and 2017 identified several former teachers in the past who had engaged in inappropriate sexual contact with students. The school hired an independent law firm to investigate allegations of misconduct, and the head of school, John Palfrey, and the head of the Board of Trustees, Peter Currie, sent an email to the school community that such transgressions must not recur.

In 2020, an Instagram account, @blackatandover, began circulating stories from anonymous current and former Black-identifying students, many of whom detailed personal experiences with racism at Phillips Academy. Several anonymous individuals raised concerns about Phillips Academy's disciplinary system, including perceived racial disparities in outcomes, a perceived emphasis on punishment over restorative justice, and an apparent lack of due process in discipline procedure outlined by the student handbook. The @blackatandover account was reported on by The New York Times, prompting school officials to form an "Anti-Racism Task Force," which released a final report in March 2022.

Notable alumni

Andover has educated two American presidents (George H. W. Bush and George W. Bush), a Supreme Court Justice (William Henry Moody), six Medal of Honor recipients (Civil War: 2; Spanish–American War: 1; World War II: 2; Korean War: 1), five Nobel laureates (making it one of only four secondary schools in the world to have educated five or more Nobel Prize winners), as well as winners of Tony, Grammy, Emmy and Academy Awards. Numerous graduates have become billionaires, including Tim Draper, venture capitalist; Ed Bass, philanthropist and environmentalist; Theodore J. Forstmann, founder of Forstmann Little & Company and IMG; and Lachlan Murdoch, CEO of the Fox Corporation.

Other notable alumni include Edgar Rice Burroughs, author known for creating Tarzan of the Apes and John Carter of Mars; Bill Belichick, coach for the New England Patriots and recipient of eight Super Bowl rings; Humphrey Bogart, an Academy Award-winning actor considered to be one of the greatest stars of American cinema; Jack Lemmon, actor and recipient of two Academy Awards; Olivia Wilde, actress; Oliver Wendell Holmes Sr., writer, polymath, and member of the Fireside poets; Francis Cabot Lowell, instrumental figure in the American Industrial Revolution and namesake of Lowell, Massachusetts; Chris Hughes, co-founder of Facebook; David Graeber, anthropologist and activist; Frederick Law Olmsted, landscape architect known for designing Central Park and the Emerald Necklace; John F. Kennedy Jr., lawyer, journalist, and son of President John F. Kennedy; and Elizabeth Stuart Phelps, an early feminist and social reformer; Jonathan Alter, journalist for Newsweek and bestselling author; Carl Andre, minimalist artist; Julia Alvarez, writer, poet and National Medal of Arts recipient; Willow Bay, journalist for the Huffington Post; John Berman, anchor for CNN; Michael Beschloss, historian; Buzz Bissinger, journalist and author of Friday Night Lights; Richard H. Brodhead, president of Duke University; Norman Cahners, publisher; Joseph Cornell, influential avant-garde artist and filmmaker; Peter Currie, CFO of Netscape; Stephen Carlton Clark, founder of the Baseball Hall of Fame; George Church, geneticist; Lucy Danziger, editor-in-chief of Self; John Darnton, Pulitzer Prize-winning journalist for The New York Times; Dana Delany, Emmy Award-winning actress; Jonathan Dee, Pulitzer Prize-winning novelist; Bill Drayton, social entrepreneur; Walker Evans, photojournalist; Charles L. Flint, co-founder of the Massachusetts Institute of Technology and the University of Massachusetts Amherst; A. Bartlett Giamatti, president of Yale University; Richard Theodore Greener, first African-American graduate of Harvard; Peter Halley, postmodernist painter and essayist central to the development of Neogeo (art) in 1980s New York; Walter Boardman Kerr, WWII correspondent for the New York Herald Tribune and author; Victor Kiam, owner of the New England Patriots and entrepreneur; William Damon, noted psychologist and educator; Tracy Kidder, Pulitzer Prize-winning literary journalist; Karl Kirchwey, poet; Heather Mac Donald, conservative political commentator; Sara Nelson, editor-in-chief of Publishers Weekly; Robert B. Stearns, co-founder of Bear Stearns; Benjamin Spock, pediatrician whose book Baby and Child Care is one of the best-selling volumes in history; Bill Veeck, owner of the Chicago White Sox and Cleveland Indians; Jigme Khesar Namgyel Wangchuck, King of Bhutan; Philip K. Wrigley, chewing gum manufacturer; and Theodore Dwight Weld, prominent abolitionist.

Alumni also includes numerous politicians and government officials, including as Katie Porter, U.S. Representative for California's 45th congressional district; Christopher Wray, the 8th Director of the Federal Bureau of Investigation; Seth Moulton, U.S. Representative for Massachusetts's 6th congressional district and 2020 presidential candidate; Jeb Bush, former Governor of Florida, 2016 presidential candidate, and member of the Bush family; Patrick J. Kennedy, U.S. Representative for Rhode Island's 1st congressional district and member of the Kennedy family; William King, first Governor of Maine and prominent proponent for Maine's statehood; Josiah Quincy III, a U.S. Representative, Mayor of Boston, President of Harvard University, and namesake of Quincy Market; Joseph Carter Abbott, U.S. Senator from South Carolina and colonel in the Civil War; Henry L. Stimson, U.S. Secretary of State and Secretary of War; Vance C. McCormick, Chair of the DNC and of the American delegation at the Treaty of Versailles; Sullivan Ballou, Union Civil War officer remembered for a letter written to his wife before he was killed at the Battle of Bull Run; James Bell, U.S. Senator from New Hampshire; Hiram Bingham III, Governor of Connecticut and U.S. Senator who rediscovered Machu Picchu; David B. Birney, Union General during the Civil War; Harlan Cleveland, U.S. Ambassador to NATO; Raymond C. Clevenger,  Senior U.S. Circuit Judge of the U.S. Court of Appeals for the Federal Circuit; Lincoln Chafee, U.S. Senator and Governor of Rhode Island; Johnson N. Camden Jr., U.S. Senator from Kentucky; Thomas C. Foley, U.S. Ambassador to Ireland; Scooter Libby, political advisor during the Bush administration; Charles Ruff, White House Council to Bill Clinton; William R. Timken, U.S. Ambassador to Germany; and Alexander Trowbridge, U.S. Secretary of Commerce.

In popular culture
Andover, often linked with Exeter, is often understood symbolically as an "elite New England prep school", connoting privilege. Writer William S. Dietrich II described Andover and other elite prep schools as being part of a "WASP ascendancy" during the first half of the twentieth century. Elite universities such as Yale and Princeton tended to accept disproportionate percentages of prep school students while using quotas to deny admission to minority applicants. An account in Time in 1931 described the two schools as having "flourished", and that both schools were "twin giants of prep schools in size and in prestige". essentially feeder schools for Ivy League universities such as Harvard and Yale, according to Joseph Lieberman. A cultural image from the 1960s was young men who had "perfect white teeth" and wore Lacoste shirts, with a look easy to identify by young women at the time:

{{Blockquote|They can tell just by looking at him whether a boy goes to an Eastern prep school or not. Not only that, they can tell which prep school, usually St. Paul's or Hotchkiss or Groton or Exeter or Andover, or whatever; just by checking his hair and his clothes.|Tom Wolfe in his book Mauve Gloves & Madmen, Clutter & Vine<ref>Tom Wolfe, McGraw-Hill Ryerson Ltd, 1967, [https://books.google.com/books?id=clk-TFmZJIQC&dq=andover+exeter+metaphor&pg=PA217 Mauve Gloves & Madmen, Clutter & Vine'], "...Not only that, they can tell which prep school, usually St. Paul's or Hotchkiss or Groton or Exeter or Andover, or whatever; just by checking his hair and his clothes." Accessed June 24, 2013</ref>}}

The WASP ascendancy began to break down around the 1960s and onwards when the admissions policies of elite prep schools and universities began to emphasize merit rather than affluence. Still, images of exclusivity based on unfairness tended to remain. Gore Vidal suggested that Andover and Exeter had a "style that was quite witty." If the WASP ascendancy has waned, the image of unaffordability continues to persist, with one writer deploring how the schools cost $30,000 and more annually. Recent reports from graduates, however, paint a picture of educational excellence and diversification. For example, Cristina Hartmann, who attended Andover from 2001 to 2003, described the school as having a need blind admissions policy. She suggested the student body was mostly diversified, and that the school had dedicated buildings for specific subject areas, was challenging academically, and had flexible teachers and peers who were "smart and driven". She elaborated that Andover provided two sign language interpreters, free of charge, to help her academically to cope with her deafness. While the overall image may be changing to one which emphasizes greater diversity and respect for individual talent, the image of the school in the media continues to connote privilege, money, exclusivity, prestige, academic quality, and sometimes negatively connotes chumminess, clubbiness, or arrogance.

The school is often mentioned in books and film, and on television. Some examples include:

 In Chapter 17 of The Catcher in the Rye, Sally Hayes introduces Holden to a boy who attended Andover. "You'd have thought they'd taken baths in the same bathtub or something when they were little kids. Old buddyroos. It was nauseating. The funny part was, they probably met each other just once, at some phony party. Finally, when they were all done slobbering around, old Sally introduced us. His name was George something—I don't even remember—and he went to Andover. Big, big deal."
 In the John Guare play Six Degrees of Separation, one of the characters laments that his parents could not afford to send him to Andover or Exeter.
 F. Scott Fitzgerald's This Side of Paradise has several characters who attended Andover.
 In Scent of a Woman, Charles Simms tries to start an argument with the irascible Lieutenant Colonel Frank Slade by saying that "... I believe President Bush went to Andover."
 In A Beautiful Mind, John Nash's imaginary Princeton roommate characterizes him as a "poor kid that never got to go to Exeter or Andover".
 In episode 17 of House of Cards, a reporter mentions that Claire Underwood attended "the prestigious Phillips Academy."
 In season 4, episode 5 of The West Wing, titled "Debate Camp", White House chief of staff Leo McGary remarks that had President Bartlet lost the election, he would have been employed as the chairman of the board of economics at Phillips Academy Andover
 In season 5, episode 15 of Gilmore Girls, titled "Jews and Chinese Food", Logan Huntzberger, when discussing boarding schools, says that he "did a year at Andover".
 In the webcomic Check, Please! both B. "Shitty" Knight and Derek "Nursey" Malik Nurse are Andover alumni.
 In the Marvel Cinematic Universe, Tony Stark was a member of the class of 1984 at Andover.
 In the film Thoroughbreds'', Lily Reynolds is expelled from Andover for plagiarism.
 In Lisa Taddeo's Three Women, main character Sloane describes her father as “Andover, Princeton, Harvard. You know what I mean... when I say that.”
On the show Jeopardy, Andover was included as the answer to a clue.

See also
 Abbot Academy
 List of Phillips Academy Heads of School
 List of Phillips Academy alumni

Notes

References

Further reading

External links

 
 
 Phillips Academy Andover on Instagram, archived from the original

 
1778 establishments in Massachusetts
Boarding schools in Massachusetts
Buildings and structures in Andover, Massachusetts
Co-educational boarding schools
Educational institutions established in 1778
Phillips family (New England)
Private high schools in Massachusetts
Private preparatory schools in Massachusetts
Schools in Essex County, Massachusetts
Six Schools League